Samuel Ealy Johnson, Sr. (November 12, 1838 – February 25, 1915) was an American politician, businessman, farmer, rancher, and namesake of Johnson City, Texas. He was the grandfather of U.S. president Lyndon B. Johnson.

Early life

Johnson was born in Wedowee, Alabama, the 10th child of Jesse and Lucy Webb ( Barnett) Johnson. Reared a Baptist, he later became a member of the Christian Church. In his later years, he became a Christadelphian, following his wife and daughter.

Career
In the late 1850s, Johnson settled with his brother Jesse Thomas Johnson, better known as Tom Johnson, in a one-room log cabin on 320 acres that became headquarters for the largest cattle driving operation in seven counties. Sam enlisted in Company B, 26th Texas Cavalry Regiment on September 18, 1861, and served until the end of the American Civil War on the coast of Texas and in Louisiana. Johnson participated in the Battle of Galveston and the Red River Campaign in Louisiana. After the war, he married Eliza Bunton of Caldwell County on December 11, 1867. In the fall of 1892, Johnson was the Populist nominee for Blanco and Gillespie counties to the Texas House of Representatives.

Notes

References

External links

 
 
 Sam E. Johnson Sr. Cabin at Lyndon B. Johnson National Historical Park
 Sam E. Johnson Sr. House at Lyndon B. Johnson National Historical Park

1838 births
1915 deaths
19th-century American politicians
19th-century Baptists
19th-century Disciples of Christ
20th-century American businesspeople
20th-century Disciples of Christ
American Disciples of Christ
Christadelphians
Burials in Texas
Businesspeople from Texas
Confederate States Army soldiers
Deaths from pneumonia in Texas
Former Baptists
Samuel Ealy
Military personnel from Texas
People from Blanco County, Texas
People from Caldwell County, Texas
People from Gillespie County, Texas
People from Randolph County, Alabama
People of Texas in the American Civil War
Ranchers from Texas
Texas Populists